Henderson is a suburb of Perth, Western Australia, located within the City of Cockburn.

History
The suburb of Henderson comprises land resumed by the Commonwealth Government in 1915 for defence purposes. A large naval base was planned by Admiral Sir Reginald Henderson, and the area was sometimes referred to as "Henderson Naval Base". The name was approved for the suburb in 1973.

In 2019, the City of Cockburn approved a split of the neighbouring suburb Munster, whereby the north-western part of the suburb would become the new suburb of Lake Coogee while another part, in the south-west, would be added to Henderson. The changes came into effect on 30 March 2020, thereby enlarging the suburb of Henderson.

Geography
It is bounded by Russell Road to the north, Cockburn Sound to the west, the Perth freight railway line to the east, and Dalison Avenue and the municipal boundary with the City of Kwinana to the south.

Australian Marine Complex
The Australian Marine Complex is located on Cockburn Sound and is considered one of the largest ship building precincts in Australia. It contains dry dock facilities and Australia's second largest ship-lift (nominal lifting capacity of 8065 tonnes). Some of the companies located in the complex include ASC, Austal, BAE Systems Australia and Civmec. In 2002 the Government proposed to use Garden Island and the facilities at Henderson for the "sea-swap" program with the United States Seventh Fleet.

References

External links

Suburbs of Perth, Western Australia
Suburbs in the City of Cockburn